Ferry Street School was a school located at 611 Ferry St. in the Fair Haven neighborhood of New Haven, Connecticut, USA.  The school was open for 57 years, from 1881 to 1938.

In the 1950s, the abandoned site was eyed for use by a fire station, but the plan never materialized.

References

Educational institutions established in 1881
Educational institutions disestablished in 1938
Schools in New Haven, Connecticut
Defunct schools in Connecticut
Fair Haven (New Haven)
1881 establishments in Connecticut